St Peter's Church is a grade-II listed anglican church in Stafford Street in Walsall, West Midlands, England. The church is an active place of worship and serves the surrounding suburbs of Birchills, Leamore, Coalpool, Harden, Ryecroft and Beechdale. The church was listed as a grade II building in 1986 and since then, has continued to serve the local community.

References

Listed buildings in the West Midlands (county)